Mr. Universe is the eighth album by American stand-up comedian Jim Gaffigan. Released on August 28, 2012, it was made available on Gaffigan's website for $5 following previously successful $5 experiments by fellow comedian Louis C.K. One dollar from every purchase of the album was donated to the Bob Woodruff Foundation.

Release
The album was released by Comedy Central Records on August 28, 2012, and was also released with the same title on DVD. It was recorded on February 25, 2012, at the Warner Theatre in Washington, D.C.

CD track listing

4 Kids	
Disney 	
Photos	
Working Out	
Bodybuilders	
McDonald's	
Shoes	
Hotel	
Hotel Pools	
Whales	
Domino's	
Subway	
Vitamins	
ExtenZe

DVD release
Coinciding with the album release, the DVD was also made available on August 28, 2012.  It is the third of Gaffigan's stand up acts to be released to home video. The special was directed by Jay Karas. The outro music for the special was written and performed by fellow comedian Reggie Watts.

Reception

The album was nominated for the Grammy Award for Best Comedy Album.

References 

Movies

Jim Gaffigan live albums
Stand-up comedy albums
Comedy Central Records albums
2012 video albums
Live video albums
Comedy Central Records video albums
2012 live albums
2010s comedy albums
2010s spoken word albums